Cervin is the surname of the following people
Andreas Cervin (1888–1972), Swedish gymnast 
Anna Cervin (1878–1972), Swedish artist
Caesar Cervin (born 1953), American association football forward 
Tore Cervin (born 1950), Swedish association football player
Ernesto Rubin de Cervin (1936–2013), Italian composer and teacher